The following is a list of presidents of Mexicali Municipality in Baja California state, Mexico. The municipality includes the city of Mexicali.

List of officials

 Rodolfo Escamilla Soto, 1953-1956 
 Raúl Tiznado Aguilar, 1956-1959 
 Joaquín Ramírez Arballo, 1959-1960 
 Federico Martínez Manautou, 1960-1962 
 Carlos Rubio Parra, 1962-1965 
 José María Rodríguez Mérida, 1965-1968 
 Francisco Gallego Monge, 1968-1969 
 Eduardo Martínez Palomera, 1970–1971, 1980-1983 
 Roberto Mazón Noriega, 1971-1974 
 Armando Gallego Moreno, 1974-1977 
 Francisco Santana Peralta, 1977–1980, 1983-1986 
 Guillermo Aldrete Hass, 1986-1989 
 Milton Castellanos Gout, 1989-1992 
 Francisco José Pérez Tejada, 1992-1995 
 Eugenio Elorduy Walther, 1995-1998 
 , 1998-2001 
 Jaime Rafael Díaz Ochoa, 2001–2004, 2013-2016 
 , 2004-2007 
 Rodolfo Valdez Gutierrez, 2007-2010 
 Francisco José Pérez Tejada Padilla, 2011-2013 
 Marina del Pilar Ávila Olmeda, 2019-2021 
Guadalupe Mora, Interim beginning 6 March 2021

See also
 Baja California state election, 2019
 Mexicali history

References

External links
 Mexicali.gob.mx

Mexicali
 
History of Baja California